The Fritz Zwicky Prize for Astrophysics and Cosmology is awarded biennially to a living person who, in the estimation of the judges, "has obtained fundamental and outstanding results related to astrophysics and/or cosmology". These results may constitute a body of work over a period of time or may be a single specific result. The Prize was established in 2020 and is awarded by the European Astronomical Society (EAS) on behalf of the Fritz Zwicky Foundation, located in Glarus, Switzerland.

Recipients are invited to deliver a plenary lecture at the following EAS Annual Meeting.

Recipients

See also

 List of astronomy awards

References

External links
 

Astronomy prizes
Physical cosmology
Awards established in 2020